The Hendersonville Skylarks were a minor league baseball team based in Hendersonville, North Carolina in 1948 and 1949. Hendersonville played an initial season in the 1904 Carolina Interstate League, before the Skylarks became members of the Class D level Western Carolina League in 1948 and 1949. The Skylarks hosted home games at the Western North Carolina Fairgrounds.

History
Hendersonville, North Carolina first hosted league baseball play in 1904. The Hendersonville team played as members of the four–team Independent level Carolina Interstate League. League records for the 1904 Carolina Interstate League are unknown.

In 1948, the Hendersonville "Skylarks" became charter members of the eight–team Class D level Western Carolina League. The Forest City Owls, Lincolnton Cardinals, Marion Marauders, Morganton Aggies, Newton-Conover Twins and Shelby Farmers joined Hendersonville as charter members.

Beginning league play on April 30, 1948, the Hendersonville Skylarks finished last in the Western Carolina League regular season standings. Ending the regular season with a record of 36–70, the Skylarks placed 8th playing under manager Charlie Munday. Hendersonville finished 31.0 games behind the 1st place Lincolnton Cardinals in the Western Carolina League regular season standings. The Skylarks did not qualify for the four–team playoffs won by Lincolnton.

In their final season of play, the 1949 Hendersonville Skylarks again placed 8th in the Western Carolina League regular season standings. The Skylarks ended the season with a record of 29–78, playing under managers Rube Wilson and Raymond Hunt as the Skylarks finished 42.5 games behind the 1st place Newton-Conover Twins. Hendersonville again missed the playoffs, won by the Rutherford County Owls. The Hendersonville Skylarks franchise permanently folded following the 1949 season, replaced by the Gastonia Browns in the 1950 Western Carolina League.

Hendersonville, North Carolina has not hosted another minor league team.

The ballpark
The Hendersonville Skylarks played home minor league games at the Western North Carolina Fairgrounds. It was reported the ballpark had a capacity of 5,000. The Berkeley Mills Ballpark was constructed in Hendersonville, North Carolina in 1949.

Timeline

Year–by–year records

Notable alumni
No alumni of the Hendersonville Skylarks reached the major leagues.

References

External links
 Baseball Reference

Defunct minor league baseball teams
Defunct baseball teams in North Carolina
Baseball teams established in 1948
Baseball teams disestablished in 1949
Hendersonville, North Carolina